Welly may refer to:

 Wellington boot, protective boot popularized by the first Duke of Wellington
 A nickname for the city of Wellington, New Zealand, and:
 Wellington Phoenix FC, professional football club based in Wellington, New Zealand, and participating in the Australian A-League